SS Samtampa was a 7,219 ton steamship wrecked on Sker Point, off Porthcawl and Kenfig, Wales, in the Bristol Channel on 23 April 1947. At the time of the shipwreck, the Samtampa was operated by the Houlder Line.

There were 47 fatalities in the incident, 39 from the ship and 8 volunteer crew of the lifeboat RNLB Edward, Prince of Wales (ON 678) from The Mumbles Lifeboat Station who died attempting to save the crew of the Samtampa. The lifeboat had returned to base, but had been sent out a second time. An oil spill from the tanks of the wrecked ship created an area of calm water, which the lifeboat coxswain, William Gammon (previously a winner of the RNLI Gold Medal), attempted to use to their advantage to enable them to pull alongside, and those who died were choked by the oil rather than drowning. The ship had sailed from Middlesbrough and most of the 39 crew hailed from the Teesside area.

A memorial to the victims of the Samtampa tragedy is in Porthcawl Cemetery and a commemorative plaque can be found marking the "final resting place of The Mumbles lifeboat" at Sker Point. The location of the wreck was 

In recognition of the sixtieth anniversary, a church service took place in Porthcawl on Saturday 21 April followed by a smaller service at Sker Point.

The Samtampa had been launched as the SS Peleg Wadsworth, a liberty ship built by the New England Shipbuilding Corporation at South Portland, Maine, and launched on 12 December 1943. Sent to Britain under the Lend-Lease program, the ship was renamed, and managed by the Houlder Line on behalf of the Ministry of War Transport.

References

External links 
70th Anniversary of the sinking of the SS Samtampa (BBC)
National Monuments Record of Wales
 

Liberty ships
Steamships
Shipwrecks in the Bristol Channel
Maritime incidents in 1947
Shipwrecks of Wales
1947 disasters in the United Kingdom
1943 ships